RSD most often refers to:
 Serbian dinar, ISO 4217 code for the currency of the Republic of Serbia
 Reflex sympathetic dystrophy, see complex regional pain syndrome
 Rejection sensitive dysphoria, see hysteroid dysphoria

RSD may also refer to:

Science and mathematics 
 Repetitive stress disorder, another term for repetitive strain injury
 Relative standard deviation in statistics
 Robust standard deviation in statistics
 Regulator of sigma D, an anti-sigma factor in E. coli bacteria
 Redshift-space distortions in cosmology
 Rejection sensitive dysphoria in psychology

Technology 
 Really Simple Discovery, an XML format describing some features of a blog service
 Remote sensing data
 Roller shutter door
 Retinal scanning display, another term for a virtual retinal display
 Recreational Software Designs, the developer of the game creation system Game-Maker

People 
 Rahul Sharad Dravid, an Indian former cricketer and commentator
 Alias of Rob Smith (British musician), British electronic musician

Education

Schools 
 Rochester School for the Deaf, a school in Rochester, New York, USA
 Royal School Dungannon, a grammar school in Northern Ireland

School districts
 United States
 Reading School District in Reading, Pennsylvania
 Recovery School District - Louisiana
 Rhinelander School District in Rhinelander, Wisconsin
 Rochester City School District in Rochester, New York
 Rockwood School District in St. Louis County, Missouri
 Roosevelt School District in Phoenix, Arizona

Music business
 Record Store Day, an annual celebration of independent record stores

Other uses
 RSD-Gaskiya, or Social Democratic Rally, a political party of Niger
 Real Social Dynamics, a US-based company specializing in teaching men how to meet and pick up women, run by Julien Blanc
 Reichssicherheitsdienst (Reich security service), Adolf Hitler's SS bodyguard unit in Nazi Germany
 A series of 6-axle locomotives produced by the American Locomotive Company
 ŘSD - Road and Motorway Directorate of the Czech Republic (Czech: Ředitelství silnic a dálnic)